Čirjak is a surname. Notable people with the surname include:

Frane Čirjak (born 1995), Croatian footballer
Lovre Čirjak (born 1991), Croatian footballer

Croatian surnames